The KTM 990 Super Duke is a motorcycle from the Austrian manufacturer KTM.

The KTM 990 Super Duke was released in 2005 with updates in 2007 and 2012. In 2008 KTM released an R model which was available until 2011. For 2012 and 2013 KTM combined parts of the regular and R model sold the model as 990 Super Duke R. Production of the KTM 990 Super Duke R ended in 2013 and in 2014 the KTM 1290 Super Duke R was introduced.

Design
The KTM 990 Super Duke has a naked body style and was designed by Gerald Kiska at the Kiska design studio in September 2003. It is built around a chromium-molybdenum trellis frame with powder-coated aluminum sub-frame and KTM LC8 engine used in several other KTM motorcycles. The engine in the KTM 990 Super Duke is a DOHC 999.8cc 75° V-twin with four valves per cylinder. The liquid cooled engine has an 11.5:1 compression ratio and uses dry sump lubrication with two rotor pumps. It has a six speed gearbox and a wet multi-plate clutch, and chain final drive.

Suspension is made by WP. In 1995, KTM Motorradholding GmbH acquired Swedish motorcycle maker Husaberg AB and took control of the Dutch company White Power Suspension). It consists out of a 48 mm upside down fork with 24° rake at the front and a WP fully adjustable shock absorber with a 4”/103 mm trail at the rear. Brakes are twin 320 mm discs with 4 piston calipers at the front and a single 240 mm disc with a single piston caliper at the rear. They are made by Brembo.

The bike has a 56.6”/1,438 mm wheelbase.

Facelifts and KTM 990 Super Duke R

2007 update
In 2007 the KTM 990 Super Duke was updated. The new model received a slight reduction of the steering head angle to 66.1° (previously 66.5°). Changes to the electronic fuel injection system were made to improve throttle response, smooth out the power delivery, and meet emissions standards. Another result of this were improved fuel economy and thus improved range. To further increase range the fuel tank's capacity was increased from 15 liters to 18.5 liters. 

The front brakes were updated from axial mounted brake calipers to radial mounted brake calipers.

Along mechanical updates the 2007 model received an updated dashboard, headlight, headlight fairings, tank fairings and tank shape.

2007–2011 KTM 990 Super Duke R
In 2007 KTM also introduced the KTM 990 Super Duke R. This model was different from the regular KTM 990 Super Duke because of the following:
 Seat was updated to a monoposto single seat
 Engine redline was increased*
 Engine power was increased from 120 hp (88 kW) at 9,000 rpm to 132 hp (97 kW) at 10,000 rpm*
 Exhaust headers made by Akrapovič*
 Steering head angle changed from 66.1° to 67.3°
 Rear suspension travel was reduced by 10 mm to 150 mm
Uprated suspension with TiAlN coating
 Linear steering damper was added
 Front and rear axle sliders
 Spools on swing arm for rear stand
 Orange powder coated frame and rear shock absorber spring
 Black brake calipers, front stanchions, engine mounts and swing arm

* Not applicable to 2007 KTM 990 Super Duke R, only on 2008–2011 models

2012 update
In 2012 KTM combined parts of the regular KTM 990 Super Duke and the KTM 990 Super Duke R and sold the model as KTM 990 Super Duke R. Differences compared to the original KTM 990 Super Duke were:
 Engine power was increased from 120 hp (88 kW) to 125 hp (92 kW)
 Steering head angle changed from 66.1° to 67.3°
 Rear suspension travel was reduced by 10 mm to 150 mm
Uprated suspension with TiAlN coating
 Linear steering damper was added
 Front and rear axle sliders
 Spools on swing arm for rear stand
 Orange powder coated frame and rear shock absorber spring
 Black brake calipers, front stanchions, engine mounts and swing arm
 Square buttons instead of round buttons on dashboard

All available colours

2005–2006
Frame: Black with silver swing arm

Fairings: Titanium, Black and Orange

2007–2011 (KTM 990 Super Duke)
Frame: Black or white frame with black swing arm (silver swing arm in 2007)

Fairings: Orange, white, olive and glossy black

2007–2011 (KTM 990 Super Duke R)
Frame: Orange with black swing arm

Fairings: Matte black (2007–2008) White (2009–2011)

2012–2013
Frame: Orange with black swing arm

Fairings: White

References 

KTM motorcycles